Ben M. "Bud" Brigham (born 1960) is an American billionaire oil and gas explorer, corporate executive, and investor.

Early life
Brigham was raised in Midland, Texas, a center for the petroleum and natural gas industries. His father left his mother to bring up their six children, and she worked for oil companies. After high school, Brigham joined the University of Texas at Austin, where in 1983 he graduated BSc in geophysics.

His first job was in Houston, working as a geophysicist processing seismic data for Western Geophysical, a 3-D seismic services firm. Then he became an exploration geophysicist and spent six years working for Rosewood Resources, an independent oil and gas exploration company.

Companies
In 1990, with an initial investment of $25,000, Brigham founded Brigham Exploration Company and was its President, Chief Executive Officer, and Chairman, in the business of searching for oil and natural gas. The company grew quickly until its public offering in 1997. In that year, it moved from Dallas to Austin.

Brigham was a leading player in the Williston Basin, Bakken, and Three Forks Shale oil and gas finds. He was the first operator to drill a long lateral high frac stage well, a key innovation largely responsible for the subsequent surge in fracking. Success with this was achieved on September 7, 2008, with the outcome that the "Bakken boom" in North Dakota quickly doubled in size. Brigham gained control of some 375,000 acres in the Williston Basin and drilled about a hundred similar long lateral high frac stage wells, producing an average of 2,800 barrels of oil equivalent per day each by December 2011, when his company was sold to Statoil ASA for $4.4 billion. After that, Brigham Exploration continued to achieve high growth in reserves, production, and income.

Brigham went on to found Anthem Ventures as a private company and Brigham Development in the field of real estate. With others, he also created Brigham Resources and Brigham Minerals, oil and gas investors, with a focus on horizontal drilling and fracking. His company Anthem Productions, in the movie business, has backed Atlas Shrugged: Part II (2012) and Atlas Shrugged Part III: Who Is John Galt? (2014), based on a novel by Ayn Rand, and My All-American (2015), a "positive values" film about the life of Freddie Joe Steinmark.

Other companies established by Brigham include Atlas Permian Water and Atlas Sand, working on water and sand in the Permian Basin.

Liberty Institute
Brigham is a supporter of the libertarian political philosophy of Ayn Rand and was reported to drive an Audi SUV with a bumper sticker reading "Who is John Galt?” echoing her novel Atlas Shrugged. He has also made forceful criticisms of the state of higher education and of climate science.

In April 2015, Brigham joined the University of Texas Chancellor’s Council Executive Committee.

In 2021, it was reported that for some years Brigham had been driving the creation of a new think tank at Austin to promote limited government, individual freedom, and free markets, provisionally named as the "Liberty Institute". Others supporting this project were Lieutenant Governor of Texas Dan Patrick and Bob Rowling, who told Texas Monthly that Brigham was "leader of the effort."

Notes

1960 births
American billionaires
American geophysicists
Living people
University of Texas at Austin alumni